Breasts is a 2020 Montenegrin drama film directed by Marija Perović. It was selected as the Montenegrin entry for the Best International Feature Film at the 93rd Academy Awards, but it was not nominated. The film premiered at the opening of the 33rd Herceg Novi Film Festival in Herceg Novi on January 22, 2020.

Synopsis
Four friends attend a school reunion, with one of the four suffering from breast cancer.

Cast
 Marija Škaričić as Ana
 Vojin Ćetković as Fuki
 Dubravka Vukotić as Jelena
 Nada Šargin as Zorka
 Predrag Bjelac as Filip
 Mira Banjac as Fukijeva

See also
 List of submissions to the 93rd Academy Awards for Best International Feature Film
 List of Montenegrin submissions for the Academy Award for Best International Feature Film

References

External links
 

2020 films
2020 drama films
Montenegrin drama films
Montenegrin-language films